Selwyn Heights  is a suburb of Rotorua in the Bay of Plenty Region of New Zealand's North Island.

Demographics

Selwyn Heights had a population of 1,134 at the 2018 New Zealand census, an increase of 87 people (8.3%) since the 2013 census, and an increase of 6 people (0.5%) since the 2006 census. There were 348 households, comprising 540 males and 597 females, giving a sex ratio of 0.9 males per female. The median age was 29.8 years (compared with 37.4 years nationally), with 309 people (27.2%) aged under 15 years, 261 (23.0%) aged 15 to 29, 450 (39.7%) aged 30 to 64, and 114 (10.1%) aged 65 or older.

Ethnicities were 55.0% European/Pākehā, 57.7% Māori, 8.2% Pacific peoples, 5.3% Asian, and 1.6% other ethnicities. People may identify with more than one ethnicity.

The percentage of people born overseas was 9.5, compared with 27.1% nationally.

Although some people chose not to answer the census's question about religious affiliation, 56.9% had no religion, 28.3% were Christian, 4.8% had Māori religious beliefs, 0.8% were Hindu, 0.3% were Buddhist and 1.6% had other religions.

Of those at least 15 years old, 72 (8.7%) people had a bachelor's or higher degree, and 207 (25.1%) people had no formal qualifications. The median income was $25,300, compared with $31,800 nationally. 45 people (5.5%) earned over $70,000 compared to 17.2% nationally. The employment status of those at least 15 was that 381 (46.2%) people were employed full-time, 120 (14.5%) were part-time, and 63 (7.6%) were unemployed.

Education

Kea Street Specialist School is also located in Selwyn Heights.

References

Suburbs of Rotorua
Populated places in the Bay of Plenty Region